The Quốc âm thi tập (國音詩集 "National language poetry collection") is a vernacular-Vietnamese language poetry book written in chữ nôm script attributed to Nguyễn Trãi. The collection of 254 poems was traditionally written after Nguyễn Trãi's retirement from court life. 

The original Quốc âm thi tập influenced emperor-reformer Lê Thánh Tông, best known for his Hồng Đức legal code. Lê Thánh Tông was also a poet, and organized a literary group, the Tao Dan, producing another vernacular chữ nôm collection, the Hồng Đức Quốc Âm thi tập (Hồng Đức National pronunciation poetry collection").

References

Vietnamese poems
Lê dynasty literature